The Public Historian is the official publication of the National Council on Public History. It is a quarterly academic journal published by University of California Press, with the journal's editorial offices housed in the History Department, University of California, Santa Barbara. First published in 1978, The Public Historian publishes the results of scholarly research and case studies in such areas as public policy and policy analysis, federal, state, and local history, historic preservation, oral history, museum and historical administration, documentation and information services, corporate biography, and public history education. The ISSN is 0272-3433.

External links
National Council on Public History official website
The Public Historian
National Council on Public History Archives

History journals
University of California Press academic journals
Quarterly journals
English-language journals
Publications established in 1978